The following is an alphabetical list of topics related to the nation of Aruba.

0–9

.aw – Internet country code top-level domain for Aruba

A
Airports in Aruba
Americas
North America
North Atlantic Ocean
West Indies
Caraïbische Zee (Caribbean Sea)
Antillen (Antilles)
Kleine Antillen (Lesser Antilles)
Islands of Aruba
Antilles
Aruba
Aruba at the Olympics
Aruba at the 2004 Summer Olympics
Aruba Dushi Tera
Atlas of Aruba

B
 Bibliography of Aruba

C
Capital of Aruba:  Oranjestad
Caribbean
Caribbean Community (CARICOM)
Caribbean Sea
Categories:
:Category:Aruba
:Category:Aruba stubs
:Category:Aruban culture
:Category:Aruban people
:Category:Aruba-related lists
:Category:Buildings and structures in Aruba
:Category:Communications in Aruba
:Category:Economy of Aruba
:Category:Environment of Aruba
:Category:Geography of Aruba
:Category:Government of Aruba
:Category:Health in Aruba
:Category:History of Aruba
:Category:Politics of Aruba
:Category:Society of Aruba
:Category:Sport in Aruba
:Category:Transport in Aruba
commons:Category:Aruba
Cities of Aruba
Coast guard – Dutch Caribbean Coast Guard
Coat of arms of Aruba
Communications in Aruba
Constitution of Aruba
Culture of Aruba

D
Demographics of Aruba
Diario Newspaper
Divi-divi
Druif Beach
Dutch colonization of the Americas
Dutch language

E
Economy of Aruba
Education in Aruba
Elections in Aruba

F

Flag of Aruba

G
Geography of Aruba
Government of Aruba
Gross domestic product

H
History of Aruba

I
International Organization for Standardization (ISO)
ISO 3166-1 alpha-2 country code for Aruba: AW
ISO 3166-1 alpha-3 country code for Aruba: ABW
Internet in Aruba
Islands of Aruba:
Aruba
Indiaanskop
Key Cay
Long Cay
Ronde Island

J

Juwana Morto

K
Kingdom of the Netherlands (Koninkrijk der Nederlanden)

L
Languages of Aruba
Leeward Antilles
Lesser Antilles
LGBT rights in Aruba
Lists related to Aruba:
List of airports in Aruba
List of Aruba-related topics
List of cities in Aruba
List of countries by GDP (nominal)
List of islands of Aruba
List of mammals of Aruba
List of political parties in Aruba
List of rivers of Aruba

M
Mammals of Aruba
Jossy Mansur
Military of Aruba
Music of Aruba

N
Northern Hemisphere

O
Oranjestad – Capital of Aruba
Outline of Aruba

P
Papiamento language
Politics of Aruba
List of political parties in Aruba
Prime Minister of Aruba

Q
Queen Beatrix International Airport

R
Rivers of Aruba

S
Scouting in Aruba
South America

T
Transportation in Aruba

V
 Visa policy of the Kingdom of the Netherlands in the Caribbean

W
West Indies
Western Hemisphere

Z
Gerald Zimmermann
Enrique Zschuschen

See also

List of Caribbean-related topics
List of international rankings
Lists of country-related topics
Outline of Aruba

References

External links

 
Aruba